PO4 may refer to:
Phosphate
 PO4: an EEG electrode site according to the 10-20 system